Warawarani (Aymara warawara star, -ni a suffix, "the one with a star", also spelled Wara Warani) is a  mountain in the Bolivian Andes. It is located in the Cochabamba Department, in the northern part of the Tapacari Province. Warawarani lies northwest of Yuraq Qaqa.

References 

Mountains of Cochabamba Department